Podbukovje pri Vačah is a small settlement east of Vače in the Municipality of Litija in central Slovenia. The area is part of the traditional region of Upper Carniola. It is now included with the rest of the municipality in the Central Sava Statistical Region.

Name
The name of the settlement was changed from Podbukovje to Podbukovje pri Vačah in 1953.

References

External links

Podbukovje pri Vačah on Geopedia

Populated places in the Municipality of Litija